Canberra Report is an Australian television series which aired 1959 to 1960 on Sydney station ATN-7. Originally hosted by George Baker, it was later hosted by Bob Sanders. The series debuted 1 November 1959.

The series featured interviews with people in the field of politics. It aired in a 15-minute time-slot.

References

External links

Black-and-white Australian television shows
1959 Australian television series debuts
1960 Australian television series endings
Australian television talk shows
English-language television shows
Seven Network original programming